Irving Jose Garcia (born 29 January 1979) is a Puerto Rican former professional boxer who competed from 1998 to 2012. He challenged for the WBA welterweight interim title in 2008 and won two regional WBC titles at the same weight.

Professional career 
Garcia faced WBA welterweight interim champion Yuriy Nuzhnenko on April 19, 2008, at the Kyiv Sports Palace in Ukraine. The bout ended in a technical draw after ten rounds due to Nuzhnenko sustaining a cut from an accidental clash of heads. One judge scored the bout 96-95 in favour of Garcia, and the other scored it a 95-95 draw, so Nuzhnenko retained the title.

Professional boxing record

External links

1979 births
Living people
Welterweight boxers
Light-middleweight boxers
People from Vega Baja, Puerto Rico
Puerto Rican male boxers